Timothy Ernest Gullikson (September 8, 1951 – May 3, 1996) was a tennis player and coach who was born in La Crosse, Wisconsin and grew up in Onalaska, Wisconsin in the United States.

Gullikson was Pete Sampras' coach from 1992 to 1995.

Tennis career
In 1977, he won three tour singles titles and was named the ATP's Newcomer of the Year. During his career as a tennis player, Gullikson won 15 top-level doubles titles, ten of them partnering with his identical twin brother, Tom Gullikson. The brothers were runners-up in the Men's Doubles competition at Wimbledon in 1983. Tim also won a total of four top-level singles titles and reached the quarter-finals of the 1979 Wimbledon Championships, beating Mike Cahill, Tomáš Šmíd, Cliff Letcher and John McEnroe in the fourth round, before losing to Roscoe Tanner. His career-high rankings were World No. 15 in singles (in 1979) and World No. 3 in doubles (in 1983).

Grand Slam finals

Doubles (1 runner-up)

Retirement
After retiring from the professional tour in 1986, Gullikson continued to play tennis in seniors events, winning the 35-over singles title at Wimbledon in 1991.

After retiring as a player, Gullikson turned his talents to coaching. He worked with several professional players, including Martina Navratilova, Mary Joe Fernández and Aaron Krickstein. Gullikson coached Pete Sampras from the start of 1992 until 1995, during which time Sampras won four Grand Slam singles titles and reached the World No. 1 ranking.

In late 1994, Gullikson suffered several seizures while touring with Sampras in Europe. The seizures were mistakenly traced to a congenital heart problem after German neurologists discovered a blood clot in his brain in December 1994. Gullikson insisted on accompanying Sampras to the Australian Open in January 1995 to help Sampras defend his title there, but collapsed during a practice session following another seizure. After tests at a Melbourne hospital proved inconclusive, Gullikson was sent home to Chicago for further testing, and the worried Sampras cried during his quarterfinal match against Jim Courier. Sampras dedicated that event – where he was runner-up to Andre Agassi – and all future events to his "great good friend" and mentor. Gullikson was later diagnosed with inoperable brain cancer.

Sampras went on to win 14 slams in his career, the remaining nine coming when Paul Annacone was his coach, Gullikson's successor.

Gullikson died in May 1996 at his home in Wheaton, Illinois. After his death, his identical twin brother Tom formed the Tim and Tom Gullikson Foundation, which funds programs to help brain tumor patients and their families with the physical, emotional and social challenges presented by the disease.

References

External links 
 
 

1951 births
1996 deaths
American male tennis players
American tennis coaches
Deaths from cancer in Illinois
Neurological disease deaths in Illinois
Deaths from brain cancer in the United States
Grand Slam (tennis) champions in mixed doubles
Identical twins
Sportspeople from La Crosse, Wisconsin
Sportspeople from Wheaton, Illinois
Tennis people from Wisconsin
Twin sportspeople
American twins
People from Onalaska, Wisconsin
US Open (tennis) champions